Kevin Sheedy may refer to:

Kevin Sheedy (Irish footballer) (born 1959), Irish former footballer
Kevin Sheedy (Australian footballer) (born 1947), Australian rules former football coach and player